Gerard Anthony Joseph McLoughlin (born 11 June 1952) in Limerick  is a former  international rugby union player.

Rugby career
McLoughlin played club rugby for Shannon and Munster. He was part of the Munster team that beat the All Blacks 12 to 0 at Thomond Park in Limerick in 1978. He played for Ireland, scoring the defining try in their 1982 triple crown win, their first since 1949. He also went on the 1983 British and Irish Lions tour to New Zealand.

Political career
McLoughlin was elected to the Limerick City Council in 2004 as an independent but joined the Labour Party in 2006. In 2012 he was elected mayor of Limerick.

Personal life
McLoughlin's daughter Orla was also elected to the Limerick City Council for the Labour Party in 2009.
His son Fionn is also a rugby player.

References

Irish rugby union players
Ireland international rugby union players
British & Irish Lions rugby union players from Ireland
Munster Rugby players
Shannon RFC players
Rugby union props
1952 births
Living people
Mayors of Limerick (city)
Local councillors in County Limerick
Rugby union players from County Limerick
Labour Party (Ireland) politicians